The House of Hesse is a European dynasty, directly descended from the House of Brabant. They ruled the region of Hesse, one branch as prince-electors until 1866, and another branch as grand dukes until 1918.

History
The origins of the House of Hesse begin with the marriage of Sophie of Thuringia (daughter of Louis IV, Landgrave of Thuringia, and Elizabeth of Hungary) with Henry II, Duke of Brabant, from the House of Reginar. Sophie was the heiress of Hesse, which she passed on to her son, Henry, upon her retention of the territory following her partial victory in the War of the Thuringian Succession, in which she was one of the belligerents.

Originally the western part of the Landgraviate of Thuringia, in the mid 13th century, it was inherited by the younger son of Henry II, Duke of Brabant, and became a distinct political entity. From the late 16th century, it was generally divided into several branches, the most important of which were those of Hesse-Kassel (or Hesse-Cassel) and Hesse-Darmstadt.

In the early 19th century, the Landgrave of Hesse-Kassel was elevated to Elector of Hesse (1803), while the Landgrave of Hesse-Darmstadt became the Grand Duke of Hesse (1806), later the Grand Duke of Hesse and by Rhine. The Electorate of Hesse (Hesse-Kassel) was annexed by Prussia in 1866, while the Grand Duchy of Hesse (Hesse-Darmstadt) remained a sovereign realm until the end of the German monarchies in 1918.

Since 23 May 2013, the head of the house has been Donatus, Landgrave of Hesse. He descends from the Hesse-Kassel branch of the family, which has been the genealogically senior male line since the house's major partition in 1567. He is married to Countess Floria-Franziska of Faber-Castell. They have three children together.

Links
Rulers of Hesse
Faber-Castell Family

Branches
Philip I, Landgrave of Hesse, died in 1567. Hesse was then divided between his four sons, thus four main branches arose: Hesse-Kassel, Hesse-Marburg, Hesse-Rheinfels and Hesse-Darmstadt.

 House of Brabant
 Hesse (1264–1567)
 Hesse-Kassel (1567–1866), became Electorate of Hesse in 1803
 Hesse-Rotenburg (1627–1834)
 Hesse-Wanfried (1627–1755)
 Hesse-Rheinfels (1627–1754)
 Hesse-Eschwege (1632-1657)
 Hesse-Philippsthal (1685-1866)
 Hesse-Philippsthal-Barchfeld (1721–1866)
 Hanau-Schaumburg (1831/1853, morganatic line)
 Hesse-Marburg (1567, divided in 1604 between Hesse-Darmstadt and Hesse-Kassel)
 Hesse-Rheinfels (1567, divided in 1583 between Hesse-Darmstadt, Hesse-Kassel and Hesse-Marburg)
 Hesse-Darmstadt (1567–1918), became Grand Duchy of Hesse in 1806
 Hesse-Butzbach (1609–1642)
 Hesse-Braubach (1609–1651)
 Hesse-Homburg (1622–1866)
 Hesse-Itter (1661–1676)
 Battenberg (1858, morganatic line. Mountbatten since 1917)

The Battenberg family are morganatic descendants in the male-line of the House of Hesse, issuing from the marriage of Prince Alexander of Hesse and by Rhine with Countess Julia Hauke who, along with her children and agnatic descendants, were made princes and princesses of Battenberg and Serene Highnesses. The Battenbergs who later settled in England changed that name to Mountbatten after World War I at the behest of George V, who substituted British peerages for their former German princely title. Those descended from the marriage of Alexander of Battenberg, Prince of Bulgaria, contracted with a commoner after the loss of his throne, were granted the title Count von Hartenau.

Hesse-Kassel and its junior lines were annexed by Prussia in 1866. Hesse-Darmstadt became the People's State of Hesse when the monarchy was abolished in 1918. Hesse-Philippsthal died out in the male line in 1925, and Hesse-Darmstadt in 1968. The male-line heirs of Hesse-Kassel and Hesse-Philippsthal-Barchfeld continue to exist to the present day.

Family tree

See also 
 List of rulers of Hesse

References

External links

 
Rulers of Hesse
Hesse